Betty Marsden (24 February 1919 – 18 July 1998) was an English comedy actress. She is particularly remembered as a cast member of the radio series Beyond Our Ken and Round the Horne. Marsden also appeared in two Carry On films, Carry On Regardless (1961) and Carry On Camping (1969).

Early life
Marsden was born in West Derby, Liverpool, and grew up in near poverty in Somerset. Her music teacher recognised her talent at the age of six, and became her guardian. She attended the Italia Conti Academy of Theatre Arts and during World War II she entertained the troops as a member of ENSA. It was at this time that she met and married her husband, Dr Jimmy Wilson Muggoch, an army doctor from Edinburgh.

Career
From 1958 to 1968, Marsden was among the cast of the radio series Beyond Our Ken and Round the Horne, where she played most of the female characters. Perhaps her most famous catchphrase was "many, many, many times", delivered in the dry, reedy tones of Bea Clissold, the ancient actress who was renowned for having given pleasure to many, particularly in "The Little Hut" on Shaftesbury Avenue. This long outlasted the Clissold character and was deployed to much audience appreciation on a few occasions in later series, possibly as an ad lib. Another was " 'allo, cheeky face!", shouted into the microphone in the less-than-couth London tones of Buttercup Gruntfuttock. Marsden's vocal range was impressive and also included the husky Daphne Whitethigh, the strident stereotypical Aussie tones of the ultra feminist (but conflicted) Judy Coolibar, and the cut-glass received pronunciation of Dame Celia Molestrangler (in a series of loose pastiches of the stilted dialogue in 1930s and 1940s romances and melodramas - for example, The Astonished Heart became The Hasty Nose - partnered with Hugh Paddick's 'ageing juvenile Binkie Huckaback', with the denouement inevitably bringing the lovers crashing back to earth).

In 1958, Marsden played the role of the Fairy Godmother, in the production of Rodgers and Hammerstein's Cinderella at the London Coliseum with Tommy Steele, Kenneth Williams, Yana and Jimmy Edwards.
 
She escaped the wrath of the critical community in London when her role of Aunt Dahlia was removed from Andrew Lloyd Webber's flop musical Jeeves (1975) before opening night.

Her two Carry On films were Carry On Regardless in 1961 (playing Mata Hari), and Carry On Camping in 1969 (playing Terry Scott's wife, Harriet, with a braying laugh and jolly bossiness).

Her other film roles included, Ramsbottom Rides Again (1956), The Big Day (1960), The Boys (1962), The Wild Affair (1964), The Leather Boys (1964), The Best House in London (1969), and Eyewitness (1970). She later played Hermione in the 1982 British film Britannia Hospital, Violet Manning in Peter Yates' 1983 film version of The Dresser, Princess Troubetskaya in the 1986 TV movie Anastasia: The Mystery of Anna, and Mrs. Barnacle in the 1987 film version of Little Dorrit.

Her theâtre roles included Mrs. Prentice in Joe Orton's What the Butler Saw at the Royal Court Theatre in 1975, and Mrs. Hardcastle in Oliver Goldsmith's She Stoops to Conquer at the Lyric Theatre, Hammersmith, in 1982.

Her many television appearances included a role in Inspector Morse (1990), The Bill, (Series 5) & Blake's 7, (Series 4).

Death
Prior to her death, Marsden had been suffering from heart problems and pneumonia. She was believed to be recovering, but died suddenly while socialising with friends in the bar of Denville Hall, a retirement home for actors, in Northwood in London.

References

External links
Betty Marsden at the British Film Institute

Betty Marsden's Obituary on the BBC News web site.

1919 births
1998 deaths
Actresses from Liverpool
Alumni of the Italia Conti Academy of Theatre Arts
Comedians from Liverpool
English film actresses
English radio actresses
English stage actresses
20th-century English actresses
20th-century British comedians